The 40th annual Venice International Film Festival was held from 31 August to 11 September 1983.

Jury
The following people comprised the 1983 jury:
 Bernardo Bertolucci (Italy) (head of jury)
 Jack Clayton (UK)  
 Peter Handke (Austria)    
 Leon Hirszman (Brazil) 
 Márta Mészáros (Hungary) 
 Nagisa Oshima (Japan) 
 Gleb Panfilov (Soviet Union)  
 Bob Rafelson (USA) 
 Ousmane Sembene (Senegal)
 Mrinal Sen (India)
 Alain Tanner (Switzerland)
 Agnès Varda (Belgium)

Films in competition

Awards
Golden Lion:
First Name: Carmen by Jean-Luc Godard
Special Jury Prize:
Biquefarre by Georges Rouquier
Silver Lion:
Sugar Cane Alley by Euzhan Palcy
Volpi Cup:
 Best Actor - Matthew Modine, Michael Wright, Mitchell Lichtenstein, David Alan Grier, Guy Boyd, and George Dzundza (Streamers)
 Best Actress - Sugar Cane Alley (Darling Legitimus)
Career Golden Lion:
Michelangelo Antonioni
FIPRESCI Prize
Fanny and Alexander by Ingmar Bergman
Die Macht der Gefühle by Alexander Kluge
Pasinetti Award
Best Film - Zelig by Woody Allen
Best Actor - Carlo Delle Piane (Una gita scolastica)
Best Actress - Angela Winkler
Pietro Bianchi Award
Luigi Zampa
De Sica Award
Summertime by Massimo Mazzucco
Toxic Love by Claudio Caligari
Technical Prize
Raoul Coutard & François Musy (First Name: Carmen)
Best First Work
Sugar Cane Alley by Euzhan Palcy

References

External links
 
 Venice Film Festival 1983 Awards on IMDb

1983 film festivals
Venice
Venice
Venice Film Festival
Film
August 1983 events in Europe
September 1983 events in Europe